Timur Rasikhovich Khamitov (born 4 April 1984) is a Russian former football player.

He represented Russia at the 2001 UEFA European Under-16 Championship.

External links
 

1984 births
People from Bashkortostan
Living people
Russian footballers
Russia youth international footballers
Russia under-21 international footballers
Association football forwards
FC Mostransgaz Gazoprovod players
FC Slavia Mozyr players
FC Daugava players
FC Shinnik Yaroslavl players
Belarusian Premier League players
Latvian Higher League players
Russian expatriate footballers
Expatriate footballers in Belarus
Expatriate footballers in Latvia
FC Znamya Truda Orekhovo-Zuyevo players
Sportspeople from Bashkortostan